Belafonte Sings of Love is an album by Harry Belafonte, released by RCA Victor in 1968.

Track listing 
 "By the Time I Get to Phoenix" (Jimmy Webb) – 2:46
 "Annie-Love" – 3:30
 "Sleep Late, My Lady Friend" – 2:15
 "Once in My Lifetime" (Sharpe, Henrique) – 2:56
 "You Time" (Wood) – 2:45
 "In The Beginning" (Fred Hellerman, Fran Minkoff) – 2:43
 "A Day in the Life of a Fool (Manhã de Carnaval)" (Carl Siman, Antonio Marizand, Luiz Bonfá) – 2:15
 "When Spring Comes Around" (Jim Friedman) – 3:15
 "In The Name of Love" (Estelle Levitt, Kenny Rankin) – 2.32
 "The First Day of Forever" (Fred Hellerman, Fran Minkoff) – 2:15
 "Each Day (I Look For Yesterday)" (Charles Singleton, Bert Keyes) – 1:53

Personnel 
 Harry Belafonte – vocals
 Arranged and conducted by Marty Manning
Production notes:
 Ernie Altschuler – producer
 Andy Wiswell – producer
 Bob Simpson – engineer

References 

1968 albums
Harry Belafonte albums
RCA Records albums